The Odeon Luxe Leicester Square is a prominent cinema building in the West End of London. Built in the Art Deco style and completed in 1937, the building has been continually altered in response to developments in cinema technology, and was the first Dolby Cinema in the United Kingdom.

Blue neon outlines the exterior of the building at night. It was built to be the flagship of Oscar Deutsch's Odeon Cinema chain and still holds that position today. It hosts numerous European and world film premieres, including the annual Royal Film Performance.

History

The Odeon cinema building was completed by Sir Robert McAlpine in 1937 to the design of Harry Weedon and Andrew Mather on the site of the Turkish baths and the adjoining Alhambra Theatre a large music hall dating from the 1850s. The site cost £550,000, and the cinema took seven months to build, at a cost of £232,755, with 2116 seats. The opening night was Tuesday 2 November 1937; the film shown that night was The Prisoner of Zenda.

The interior was an art-deco auditorium, with a ribbed ceiling and sidewalls, featuring concealed strip lighting in coves, and two bas relief sculptures of naked nymphs were positioned on the front splay walls, as if leaping towards the screen.  All the seats were covered in a faux-leopard skin material. A modernisation in 1967 removed many of the original features, with all of the ribbed plasterwork from the balcony to the proscenium replaced by smooth finishes. A refurbishment in 1998 included new versions of some lost details, including the figures, and seating upholstery pattern.

The UK's first widescreen (screen ratio 1.66:1) was installed and premiered on 14 May 1953; the film shown was Tonight We Sing. The British public debut of CinemaScope (screen ratio 2.55:1) followed on 19 November 1953 with the quasi-biblical epic, The Robe. (The first cinema to install CinemaScope in the UK was the Odeon Tottenham Court Road on 9 June 1953, but it was not open to the public until later).

The theatre's chief engineer, Nigel Wolland, was appointed MBE for services to the film industry in 2007. The theatre's general manager, Chris Hilton, was appointed  MBE for services to the film industry in 2010.

After Nigel Wolland's retirement in 2006, Mark Nice was appointed the cinema's chief engineer. Mark Nice was later promoted to the position of Odeon company engineer with Toni Purvis and Michael Mannix assuming the role of Operations Manager Digital.

Technical specifications

The first Dolby Cinema system to be installed in the UK is at the Odeon in Leicester Square. This introduced a combination of Dolby Vision dual-laser projection system and a Dolby Atmos sound system.

The Odeon is the largest single-screen cinema in the United Kingdom and one of the few with its circle and stalls remaining intact.  The cinema is equipped to show films in 35mm, 70mm and digital on a 48 ft. widescreen and includes stage facilities for live performances.

The cinema has an operating Compton organ, its console lit from within by coloured lighting, and a safety curtain detailed in 1930s art-deco motifs.

Two sets of tabs (curtains) are also installed and used for most performances. The cinema houses all major digital sound systems: Sony Dynamic Digital Sound, Dolby Digital and DTS.  It had the UK's first wide-screen installed in 1953, and more recently, was the first to have a digital projector installed in 1999.

There are 800 seats – including 22 full-recliner seats in the Royal Box – and a "Royal Retiring Room" for visiting monarchs. Oscar's Bar (named after Odeon's founder Oscar Deutsch) features views across Leicester Square from a glass enclosed balcony.

In March 2011, all the cinema's screens converted to digital projection equipment with 3D capability. Up until 2009 the cinema and film distributors did not have faith in the reliability of digital presentations, so the cinema would run a 35mm print alongside. If the digital show failed the projectionist would switch to film. If that projector then failed, the performance would be abandoned. One 35mm/70mm projector has been retained, and has been used for recent 70mm releases including Interstellar, The Hateful Eight, Dunkirk and Death on the Nile. A silver screen is used for 3D presentations, placed in front of the white screen used for 2D presentations. The silver screen is a fraction smaller and screen tabs are not used during 3D performances. Most of the trained projectionists at the Odeon retired, or were made redundant in 2011. Presentations are now mostly automated.

Screens 2 – 5
Five screens, each seating between fifty and sixty patrons, were added in April 1990 in what was once an alleyway running alongside the main house. The screens were originally known as Odeon Mezzanine and were renamed Odeon Studios in 2012. Following the refurbishment in 2018, the number of screens was reduced to four with reduced capacity and renamed as Screens 2 – 5.

Recent developments
In 2018 Odeon undertook a full refurbishment at a projected cost of £1015 million, which saw the building retained as a single-screen cinema with stalls and circle levels, with the stated intention to maintain its character. The cinema closed on 10 January 2018  with an anticipated reopening in time for the BFI London Film Festival in October—which it failed to meet. The cinema reopened on 21 December 2018 rebranded as part of the Odeon Luxe chain, with a reduced capacity in luxury seats, an enhanced concession offering, and the first commercial Dolby Cinema screen to open in the UK.

See also

 Odeon Cinemas, the British cinema chain
 Odeon Marble Arch, a former cinema also located in London's West End
 Odeon West End, a second cinema on the south side of Leicester Square until 2015
 Scenes in the Square, which includes a statue of Batman on the roof of the cinema

References

Sources
 Guide to British Theatres 1750–1950, John Earl and Michael Sell pp. 128 (Theatres Trust, 2000)

External links
Alhambra Theatre History Archive material, information, and images on the Alhambra Theatre, Leicester Square
Leicester Square webcam – Close up of the Odeon Cinema for film premieres
The Cinema Organ Society information on the organ
Film Premieres in Odeon leicester square

Cinemas in London
Streamline Moderne architecture in the United Kingdom
Leicester Square
Leicester Square
Art Deco architecture in London
Public venues with a theatre organ